Porter Kandan is a 1955 Indian Tamil-language film directed by K. Vembu. The film stars M. K. Radha and G. Varalakshmi.

Cast
The list is adapted from the database of Film News Anandan.

M. K. Radha
G. Varalakshmi
Valayapathy G. Muthukrishnan
D. Balasubramaniam
T. S. Durairaj
T. P. Muthulakshmi
M. N. Nambiar
R. Lalitha
S. V. Subbaiah
Rajamani
M. K. Mustafa
K. Doraisami
'Master' Babuji
'Baby' Maheswari

Production
The film was produced by V. L. Narasu under the banner Narasu Studios (a subsidiary of Narasu coffee company) and was directed by K. Vembu. P. Chengaiah wrote the story while the dialogues were written by M. S. Kannan, Novelist Sandilyan and K. T. Shanmugasundaram. Cinematography was by M. Masthan while the editing was done by R. Rajagopal and Balaraman. A. K. Sekar was the art director while P. G. Chellappa was the choreographer. Still photography was done by R. P. Sarathy.

Soundtrack
Music was composed by the duo Viswanathan–Ramamoorthy while the lyrics were penned by A. Maruthakasi, Ambikapathy, Azha. Valliyappa and K. T. Shanmugasundaram. Playback singers are Thiruchi Loganathan, S. C. Krishnan, Sellamuthu, Madhavan, V. N. Sundaram, Ghantasala, Jikki, K. Rani, Baby Rajakumari, Krishnaveni and Baby Jaya.

References

External links

Indian drama films
Indian black-and-white films
Films scored by Viswanathan–Ramamoorthy
1950s Tamil-language films